I Am Not What You Want (天使, literally: angel,  Cantonese: tin si) is a romance movie produced by Kit Hung in Hong Kong in 2001. This movie is about 48 minutes.

Plot 

This movie is about a gay university student Ricky (Chet Lam) and Mark (Nicky Hung). Ricky comes out to his family and friends, but his "fag hag" Olivia (Carol Chan) doesn't seem to be convinced. Being rejected by his parents, Ricky moves in with his friend Mark. Mark in his heart is gay too, but he has not yet come out to anyone, including his girlfriend Mabel (Joyee Lam). The movie focuses on the process of Mark's trying to face his sexual orientation.

Songs 
Flower and Glass, by Chet Lam
Me and Instant Noodles, by Chet Lam  
Come Closer, by Chet Lam
One vs Two, by Chet Lam, performed by Lam Yee Man

Selected Festival Screenings 

World Premiere: 
2001 The Mix New York Lesbian and Gay film and video festival, United States
European Premiere: 
2002 International film festival Rotterdam, Holland.

Other screenings includes:
2003 Broadway Cinematheque, Hong Kong
2003 Museum of Modern Art, Dallas, Texas, United States
2003 Tokyo Gay and Lesbian Film Festival, Japan
2003 Gay Asian Film Festival Amsterdam
2003 School of the Art Institute of Chicago Queer Film and Video Festival
2003 South Taiwan Film and Video Festival
2002 San Francisco International Lesbian & Gay Film Festival
2002 Out On Screen, Vancouver Queer Film + Video Festival
2002 Inside Out Lesbian & Gay Film & Video Festival of Toronto  
2002 Bangkok International Gay and Lesbian film festival, Thailand  
2002 Toronto Reel Asian International Film Festival
2002 Global Queers, Oriental Homos-Currents of Asian Queer Cinema, Seoul Queer Film Achieve, Korea
2002 Melbourne Queer Film Festival, Australia 
2002 Hong Kong Gay and Lesbian film festival
2002 The independence film and video award, Hong Kong
2002 Q! Film Screening, Jakarta, Indonesia 
2001 Tampa International Gay and Lesbian Film Festival, Florida, United States
2001 Austin Gay & Lesbian International Film Festival, Taxes, United States
2001 Competition section, The International Festival of New Film, Split, Croatia
2001 Competition section, Internationaal Speelfilmfestival, "De Drake", Gent, Belgium

Awards
2001 Special Jury Award, Internationaal Speelfilmfestival, "De Drake", Gent, Belgium

See also
Queer culture
List of gay-related movies

External links

2001 films
2000s Cantonese-language films
Hong Kong LGBT-related films
2000s Hong Kong films